These are terms, concepts and ideas that are useful to understanding the political situation in the Weimar Republic. Some are particular to the period and government, while others were just in common usage but have a bearing on the Weimar milieu and political maneuvering.

Agrarian Bolshevism — an idea by several political parties, involving the expropriation of large estates (mostly those of junkers in Prussia) and passing them out to peasants.
Angestellte — White-collar employees
Barmat scandal — brothers Julius, Herschel, Solomon and Isaak, who owned a huge conglomerate of businesses and overextended themselves.  Their bankruptcy involved millions of dollars and they bribed politicians on all levels of the Social Democratic party. It was a factor in the rise of Nazism.
Barmat Committee — The Landtag of Prussia set up a special fact-finding commission.
Beamte — civil service employees
Best proclamation — the SA draft proclamation for the exigency when and if the communists would revolt after a Nazi electoral victory; found in the house of Dr. Werner Best, legal advisor to the Nazi Party; became a major embarrassment for Hitler.
Black Reichswehr — another name for the Freikorps system
'black' soldiers — the ex-soldiers involved in Freikorps units
Bonzen — bosses; slang term for the Weimar system and those who enriched themselves at the expense of the workers.
Conservative Revolutionary movement — a German nationalist literary youth movement, prominent in the years following World War I.
der eiserne Hindenburg — the Iron Hindenburg; Hindenburg was the epitome for solidness
der Krieg nach dem Krieg — "the war after the war"; the civil war that erupted in Germany after World War I; the turmoil of the Weimar Republic.
Dolchstoßlegende — "Stab in the back" legend; the idea that the German Army was betrayed by subversive elements at home; i.e. the socialists, pacifists, liberals and Jews.
Einwohnerwehren — civil guards; small civilian units established by General Maercker for the purpose of urban combat against communist revolutionaries; these civil units grew into the Orgesch.
Ernährungsautarkie — agricultural self-sufficiency
freebooters — the men of the Freikorps
Freikorps — free corps; far-right paramilitary organizations made up of disillusioned World War I soldiers that sprung up around Germany as soldiers returned in defeat from World War I.  They were frequently involved in political brawls, especially against the communists.
Friedenssturm — Peace Offensive; term given by General Ludendorff to the last great offensive of World War I hoping to break Allied resolve.
Froschperspektive — frog's-eye view; the German ex-soldier's outlook of World War I; categorization of ex-soldiers' memoirs.
Honoratioren — important community leaders such as the major and village priest.
industrial rationalization — the furious pace of major technological, financial, and economic reorganization that German industry underwent between 1924 and 1929.
Inheritance
Partible inheritance — inheritances such as farms can be broken up amongst heirs; the culture of Catholic Bavaria
Impartible inheritance — inheritance passed only to the oldest son; family farmland prevented from being broken up amongst heirs.
Kapp Putsch — (also Kapp-Lüttwitz Putsch) of March, 1920 was an attempted military coup of the extreme right-wing aimed at overthrowing the Weimar Republic.  It was a direct result of the Weimar government's acceptance of the Treaty of Versailles. It failed when the army did not intervene and a general strike paralyzed the capital.
Kriegspiel — preliminary situation report; General von Schleicher made one about the military's incapability to meet civil unrest. This one convinced von Papen to resign.
Kriegserlebnis — (myth of the) war experience
Kuhhandel — cattle trading; German slang term for the political maneuverings in the parliament and in the Weimar government.
Kultur — culture 
Landtag — state legislature
Landespolizei — state police
Green police — another term for police (as opposed to the "police" of various paramilitary groups), because they wore green uniforms
London ultimatum — set the total sum of war damages to the Allies at 132 billion marks.
Lausanne Agreement — Allies in order to forestall a Nazi government practically abolished the German reparations burden; major foreign policy success for Chancellor von Papen; July 9, 1932.
Marstall — stables; ordered to be cleared during the Battle of the Schloss.
Ministeramt — ministerial office
Nahrungsfreiheit —  self-sufficiency in nourishment.
New Middle Class — white collar workers; consisted of the service and clerical (bookkeeping) occupations for management, industry and government
Old Middle Class — consisted of self-employed farmers, shopkeepers, merchants and artisans
Orgesch — Organisation Escherich; the civil guards that grew into the reserve militia for the German Army under the command of Major Dr. Forstrat Georg Escherich.
Osthilfe — the 1931 government assistance programs for large eastern German estates. It made available 1.5 billion marks for farmers to make debt conversion and lowered local taxes and freight rates.
Quasselbude — "twaddling shop"; Nazi slang term given to the German parliament
Räterepublik — workers councils or "soviet" republics; the communist revolutions in Berlin and Munich
Red terror — violence of the communist uprisings (see also White Terror)
Reichsheer — = army of the Reichswehr
Reichswährungskommissar — national currency commissioner
Reichswehr — the German armed forces 1921-1934
Rentenmark Miracle — Dr. Hjalmar Schacht issued the Rentenmark which was pegged to the price of gold and had an exchange rate of 4.2 marks per dollar. It ushered in five years (1924–1929) of economic stability and a new period of prosperity for the Weimar Republic.
Saupreiss — Prussian swine; Bavarian slang term for Prussians because of their domination of German politics and culture.
Der Stahlhelm — (The Steel helmet, League of front-line Soldiers); the largest of the paramilitary Freikorps organizations that arose after World War I. It was an accumulation point for nationalistic and anti-Weimar Republic elements.
Schloss — castle
Battle of the Schloss — The Volksmarine Division led by Lt. Dorrenbach seized the Kaiser's castle and stables which defeated an army unit sent to dislodge them.
Vertrauensmann — low-level political agent; Reichswehr sent agents to infiltrate political parties; The Bavarian unit sent Hitler as a Vertrauensmann to the Deutsche Arbeiterpartei.
von —  an aristocratic appellation to German names, though it does not always signify that class. Also as vom, the unindicated contraction of von dem, meaning "from the". 
Wahlkreise — Weimar electoral districts.
Wehrkreis — military districts within Weimar Germany
Weimar Coalition — the first solid majoritarian parties; the Social Democratic Party (37.9%), the Catholic Center Party (19.7%), the liberal Democratic Party (18.6%).
Wehrverbände — volunteer defense units
White terror — violence of the counter-revolutionary and anti-communist forces, i.e. the Freikorps. (see also Red Terror)
Young Plan — the new reparations agreement negotiated by Gustav Stresemann at The Hague;
anti-Young coalition — Alfred Hugenberg with the Nationalist Party; Stahlhelm; the Pan-German League and Dr. Schacht of the Reichsbank; the campaign began in September 1929.
Zusammenstösse — clashes, gang fights; the brawls between the various political paramilitary groups

See also
Weimar political parties
Weimar paramilitary groups
Glossary of the Third Reich

Further reading
 Halperin, S. William. Germany Tried Democracy: A Political History of the Reich from 1918 to 1933 (1946) online.

Weimar Republic
Weimar Republic
Wikipedia glossaries using unordered lists